DeAndrea Gist "Dee" Benjamin (née DeAndrea Donale Gist; born 1972) is an American lawyer serving as a United States circuit judge of the United States Court of Appeals for the Fourth Circuit. She previously served as a judge of the South Carolina Circuit Court for the fifth district.

Early life and education 
Benjamin was born in 1972 in Columbia, South Carolina, to Donald and Adrienne Gist. She graduated from Columbia High School in 1990. Benjamin earned a Bachelor of Arts degree from Winthrop University in 1994 and a Juris Doctor from the University of South Carolina School of Law in 1997.

Career 
In 1997 and 1998, Benjamin served as a law clerk for Judge L. Casey Manning. In 1998 and 1999, she was an assistant solicitor in the Juvenile and Family Court Division of the Fifth Judicial Circuit Solicitor's Office. From 1999 to 2001, she served as an assistant attorney general in the South Carolina Attorney General's Office. Benjamin worked at the Gist Law Firm from 2001 to 2011.

In 2001, South Carolina Governor Jim Hodges appointed Benjamin to the Juvenile Parole Board where she served from July 2001 to June 2004. From 2004 to 2011, she was a Columbia city judge. In February 2010, Benjamin had an unsuccessful bid for family court (Fifth Judicial Circuit Family Court Seat 1). She was appointed to serve as a judge of the South Carolina Circuit Court for the fifth district in 2011. In 2021, Benjamin lost a bid for the South Carolina Court of Appeals. The legislature instead chose then-family court judge Jay Vinson of Florence in a 94–63 vote.

Federal judicial service 
On August 9, 2022, President Joe Biden announced his intent to nominate Benjamin to serve as a United States circuit judge of the United States Court of Appeals for the Fourth Circuit. On September 6, 2022, her nomination was sent to the Senate. President Biden nominated Benjamin to the seat vacated by Judge Henry F. Floyd, who assumed senior status on December 31, 2021. House Majority Whip Jim Clyburn recommended Benjamin for the vacancy. On November 15, 2022, a hearing on her nomination was held before the Senate Judiciary Committee. During her confirmation hearing, Republican senators questioned her decisions granting bond and early release of defendants. On December 8, 2022, her nomination was reported out of committee by a 13–9 vote. On January 3, 2023, her nomination was returned to the President under Rule XXXI, Paragraph 6 of the United States Senate; she was renominated later the same day. On February 2, 2023, her nomination was reported out of committee by a 12–8 vote. On February 7, 2023, the Senate invoked cloture on her nomination by a 54–43 vote. On February 9, 2023, her nomination was confirmed by a 53–44 vote. She received her judicial commission on February 21, 2023. She became the second African-American woman to serve on the 4th Circuit, and the first African-American woman from South Carolina to serve on that circuit court.

Personal life 
Benjamin married Stephen K. Benjamin in 2002. He served as mayor of Columbia from 2010 to 2022. They have two daughters. In December 2013, Benjamin's brother Donald Gist Jr. was shot and killed in a parking lot of a Queens Mini-Mart store in Charlotte, North Carolina.

See also 
 List of African-American federal judges
 List of African-American jurists

References

External links 

1972 births
Living people
20th-century American women lawyers
21st-century American women judges
21st-century American judges
21st-century American women lawyers
21st-century American lawyers
African-American judges
African-American lawyers
Judges of the United States Court of Appeals for the Fourth Circuit
Lawyers from Columbia, South Carolina
South Carolina state court judges
United States court of appeals judges appointed by Joe Biden
University of South Carolina School of Law alumni
Winthrop University alumni